Bernard Meyer may refer to:
 Bernard F. Meyer (1891–1975), American Catholic missionary
 Bernard S. Meyer (1916–2005), American lawyer and politician

See also
 Ernest Meyer (1865–1919), French show jumping champion, incorrectly listed as Bernard Meyer
 Bernard C. Meyers (born 1955), American photographer
 Bernhard Meyer